The International Open Series (often referred to as Pontins International Open Series or PIOS for sponsorship purposes), was a series of snooker tournaments that ran from the 2001/02 season until the 2009/10 season. It was originally called the Open Tour but was renamed in 2005/2006.

History 
The tour was established to provide players not on the WPBSA Main Tour or Challenge Tour with professional competition, and the best performers were promoted to the Challenge Tour. It was organised by the World Professional Billiards and Snooker Association (WPBSA) during its first season, but the English Association of Snooker and Billiards (EASB), an amateur body, took it over from 2002/03. The event was open to professionals, amateurs and international players for the first couple of seasons, but following the EASB's split from the WPBSA for 2003/04 the entry criteria were revised barring professional and non-English players from entering. After the Challenge Tour was discontinued, the entry criteria were revised again to allow international amateur players to compete, and from 2005/06 the competition promoted players directly to the Main Tour. The series was abandoned after the 2009/10 season and replaced by the Q School in the 2010/11 season.

Event finals

Order of Merit winners

References

Recurring sporting events established in 2001
Recurring events disestablished in 2010
Snooker competitions in the United Kingdom
Snooker amateur competitions
Defunct snooker competitions
Defunct sports competitions in the United Kingdom
Snooker tours and series